Gerhard Schürer (14 April 1921 – 22 December 2010) was a leading politician in East Germany.

Between 1963 and 1989 he was a member of the powerful Central Committee of the country's ruling SED (party).   He also served, between 1965 and 1989, as chairman of the State Planning Commission of East Germany's Council of Ministers.

It is one mark of his importance that during the 1980s Schürer lived with his family at House 7 in the Wandlitz residential estate.   Wandlitz was the exclusive Berlin enclave where the top party officials lived.   House 7 was a large house, with space to accommodate his (at this stage) second wife and seven children.   A previous occupant had been Chairman Walter Ulbricht.   After reunification, and as the German Democratic Republic receded into history, there were times when he felt able to recall his experiences with greater candour and clarity than others who had known the ruling establishment from the inside.

Life

Early years
Paul Gerhard Schürer was born in Auerbach, on the northeastern edge of Zwickau in Saxony.   His father was a factory worker and house painter.   His mother worked as a hairdresser.   After leaving school, between 1936 and 1939 he undertook a training as a machinist.   He also undertook flight training with the Hitler youth, learning to fly on a glider.   1939 was the year in which war broke out, and after serving his six-month period of compulsory State Labour Service, Schürer joined the Luftwaffe.

He was badly injured in 1942 and assessed as unfit for frontline service ("frontuntauglich").   Between 1942 and 1945 he worked as a flying instructor, posted at various stages to Pilsen and Dresden-Klotzsche.

Soviet occupation zone
War ended in May 1945 and a large chunk of what had been central Germany, including both Saxony and the area surrounding Berlin, found itself administered as the Soviet occupation zone.   In the immediate aftermath of war Schürer worked in the agriculture sector.   Between June and October 1945 he was employed as a steel fitter at the Elbe Valley Iron Works in Dresden.   During 1946 he took various factory and driving jobs.   In 1946 he obtained work as a truck driver and then obtained a skilled job at a truck plant in Dresden.

Between January and November 1947 Schürer attended the Industrial Management Academy at Mittweida.     He became a member of the recently formed Socialist Unity Party (Sozialistische Einheitspartei Deutschlands / SED) in 1948.    The SED had been formed a couple of years earlier in a top-down process which had not gone uncontested, and by 1948 it was on the way to becoming the ruling party in a new form of one-party dictatorship.   During 1948 Schürer was a student at the SED's local "Ernst Thälmann" party academy ("Kreisparteischule") in Seefrieden.   Shortly after this, in October 1949, the Soviet occupation zone was relaunched as the Soviet sponsored German Democratic Republic (East Germany).

German Democratic Republic
He now moved into regional government, working with the Main Economic Planning Department for Saxony between 1947 and 1951, becoming head of the department.   Between March and December 1951 he also served in his first national role, as leader of the Regional Planning Group (later departmental leader) with the State Planning Commission.   Evidence that he had been identified for rapid promotion came in 1952 which he spent as a student at the regional party academy.

Between 1953 and 1955 Schürer was employed in the Finance and Planning department of the powerful Party Central Committee.   Between 1955 and 1958 he spent much of his time in Moscow where he attended the Communist Party Academy, emerging with a degree.  Between 1958 and 1960 he was deputy departmental leader of the Department of Party Central Committee's Planning, Finance and Technical Department, taking over from Fritz Müller as head of the department  in 1960.   Schürer combined this responsibility with membership of the Politburo's Economics Commission.   Further promotion followed in 1962 when he became deputy head of the State Planning Commission.   He took over leadership of the Planning Commission just three years later in 1965, when, according to Schürer, the incumbent, Erich Apel, shot himself after failing to win more than lukewarm support from Walter Ulbricht in the context of a trade and finance deal he was attempting to negotiate with the Soviets.   For Schürer leadership of the Planning Commission was accompanied by membership of the presidium of the Council of Ministers and, after 1966, co-chairmanship of the East German-Soviet Parity Commission for economic and technical collaboration.

The Leninist precepts of East German constitution set out the "leading role" of the party in unambiguous terms, although the stark reality of the party's leading role was blurred to the extent that Party Central Committee members often combined their party roles with membership of the National parliament or ministerial office.   Nevertheless, it was membership of the Party Central Committee, between 1963 and 1989, which placed Gerhard Schürer at the heart of the East German power structure.   Within the Central Committee he was also a candidate member of the Politburo from 1973, although it was only towards the end of 1989, a few weeks before the entire government apparatus collapsed, that he finally achieved full membership of the Politburo.

Disagreements over deficit based economic management
There are suggestions that during the final years of the German Democratic Republic, Gerhard Schürer frequently found himself thwarted by the powerful economic secretary to the Party Central Committee, Günter Mittag.   Schürer's own recollection, ten years after the wall came down, was that he and Mittag had originally been in agreement on important financial and economic matters.   The underlying problem arose from differing interpretations of the policy called "unity of economic and social policy" ("Einheit von Wirtschafts- und Sozialpolitik") inaugurated in June 1971 under the leadership of Erich Honecker as an attempt to make the country economically self-financing through a return to a "micro-managing" approach to economic planning, focusing on growth sectors including electronics, plastic and chemicals.  Ulbricht had been removed from power in May 1971 by Erich Honecker, whose interpretation of the policy incorporated massive borrowing, much of which was consciously applied not to increased investment but to increased consumption.   It was Schürer's position that the rapid growth in borrowing was unsustainable and, in the longer term, a route to national bankruptcy.   By 1989 Schürer probably felt he had the dubious satisfaction of having been proved right by events.   In the shorter term, Schürer's eighteen-year wait on the candidate list for Politburo membership was, even by the standards of the time and place, a long one.   When he raised the risk of national bankruptcy in Central Committee meetings, he was rewarded by being designated a "saboteur" by none other than Honecker himself.   Under a government that was criticism averse, being accused of sabotage by the head of government and the head of state was a very serious matter.

Schürer report
On 30 October 1989, together with Ernst Höfner, Arno Donda and Alexander Schalck-Golodkowski, Gerhard Schürer presented an "Analysis of the Economic Condition of the German Democratic Republic, with conclusions" ("Analyse der ökonomischen Lage der DDR mit Schlußfolgerungen").   The report had been requested by the newly appointed Party Secretary Egon Krenz, for presentation to the Politburo.   The analysis disclosed a catastrophic picture.   The East German economy was over-indebted and had for years "been consuming itself" ("zehrt seit Jahren von der Substanz").   A far reaching economic reform programme was proposed, but in the view of the authors that would not be enough to avert looming national insolvency.   The only remaining hope was massive additional loans from the German Federal Republic ("West Germany").

For the German Democratic Republic, the Schürer report was an important catalyst along what is sometimes presented as an unstoppable road toward reunification, which took place the next year, formally in October 1990.   For Gerhard Schürer, on both sides of the Inner German border, it permanently raised the public profile of a man who, when appointed as head of the State Planning Commission back in 1965, might reasonably have hoped to end his career in circumstances of comfortable obscurity.

Régime change
On 7 November 1989 the government resigned.   In January 1990 Gerhard Schürer was excluded from the ruling SED (party), which by this time was in the process of reinventing itself for a democratic future as the Party of Democratic Socialism ( Partei des Demokratischen Sozialismus / PDS).    Accused of "Criminal abuse of trust" ("verbrecherischen Vertrauensmißbrauchs") he was arrested on 22 January 1990 and sent to spend the next three months in prison.   In the event he was released after eighteen days and the East German prosecuting authorities called off their investigation in May 1990.   He was never charged, but the two and a half weeks spent in cell number 108 of a Berlin "Investigation Prison" did not leave him entirely unmarked.   Nevertheless, he was not ready nor, he later claimed, financially able to retire, and he took a succession of casual jobs that included gardening for neighbours, washing cars and care work with the elderly.   Later he managed a tights and stocking factory in the Allgäu that was keen to expand into the newly open markets of central Europe.   As time moved on, he was also more ready than most of its former leaders to talk to journalists about the German Democratic Republic, of which he could sometimes be critical.

Awards and honours
 1964 Patriotic Order of Merit in silver
 1971 Patriotic Order of Merit in gold
 1981 Order of Karl Marx

References

People from Zwickau
Members of the Central Committee of the Socialist Unity Party of Germany
Members of the Volkskammer
Recipients of the Patriotic Order of Merit
1921 births
2010 deaths
Hitler Youth members
Reich Labour Service members
Luftwaffe personnel of World War II